Pentorex (Modatrop), also known as phenpentermine or α,β-dimethylamphetamine, is a stimulant drug related to phentermine which is used as an anorectic to assist with weight loss. It also acts as a diuretic. Pentorex was developed by Nordmark in the 1960s.

References 

Substituted amphetamines
Anorectics
Norepinephrine-dopamine releasing agents